"Don't Bring Me Down" is a song written by Johnny Dee (road manager for British band the Fairies) and first performed by the rock band the Pretty Things in 1964.  It was a number 10 hit on the UK Singles Chart, and reached number 34 in Canada. The song was featured on the American version of their debut album, The Pretty Things.

For other songs with the same title, see the remarks in the article on "Don't Bring Me Down" by The Animals.

Personnel
 Phil May – vocals, harmonica 
 Dick Taylor – lead guitar 
 Brian Pendleton – guitar
 John Stax – bass guitar
 Viv Prince – drums

References

Pretty Things songs
1964 singles
Fontana Records singles
1964 songs